The 2018 CAMS Australian Formula 4 Championship (initially known for sponsorship purposes as the CAMS Jayco Australian Formula 4 Championship and later as the CAMS Payce Australian Formula 4 Championship) was the fourth Australian Formula 4 Championship, a motor racing competition for open-wheel racing cars complying with Formula 4 regulations, which were created by the Fédération Internationale de l'Automobile (FIA) for entry-level open-wheel championships. Teams and drivers competed in twenty-one races at six venues, starting on 7 April and ending on 4 November.	
	
The championship was won by Jayden Ojeda.

Entries	
The following drivers contested the championship. The following Australian-registered teams and drivers contested the championship.	
	
	
Each entry utilised a Mygale M14-F4 chassis and a Ford engine.

Calendar	
The 2018 championship was held across seven rounds in Australia and New Zealand, supporting the Supercars Championship and the Shannons Nationals.

Calendar changes	
 The championship visited New Zealand for the first time, with the final round of the championship to be held at Pukekohe Park Raceway.	
 The championship made its debut at Winton Motor Raceway.	
 The championship returned to Symmons Plains Raceway after a one-year absence.	
 The Sandown, Barbagallo and Surfers Paradise rounds were discontinued.

Points system	
Championship points were awarded in each race as follows:

Championship standings

References

External links	
	
	
	
	
Australian F4 Championship seasons	
Australian	
Formula 4
Australian F4